Rap Rakesh Sethulingam (born 11 January 1999) better known as Rap Rakesh, is the Pioneer of Music " YouTuber" in Tamilnadu who started the first Independent Artist YouTube Channel and Released two Official songs before the start up of YouTube Channels like Sony Music, Saregama, T series,etc..Rap Rakesh, is an entrepreneur, composer, lyricist, rapper, singer, and performer. He is one of the Pioneers of Tamil Hip-hop in India(Among 3) who took interest in rapping ever since he was in school.

Career
Rakesh popularised rap when it still was not big in Tamil music. Inspired by ‘Pettai Rap’, he composed his own song in 2009, performed it at IIT Saarang and won the first prize. Since then, he has been known as Rap Rakesh to his friends, and now, to his Facebook fans as well. He shot to fame with 'Munne Vaada' song which is centered on physically challenged people in 2014. Later in 2016, Rakesh launched his next music video titled '12 AM'. The video is said to be an ode to woman, who were killed brutally by anti-social elements.

Rakesh studied at Our Lady of Lourdes School, Pollachi & P.K.D School, Pollachi. Later he joined in Diploma (INFORMATION TECHNOLOGY) at 
Nachimuthu Polytechnic College, Pollachi and Engineering (BTech) at Bannari Amman Institute of Technology, Sathyamangalam in the Erode district. Later Worked for a Software Company in Bangalore and Coimbatore as ASP.NET Developer and He is also a graduate in Master of Business Administration(MBA).

Independent projects

As actor

References

External links
 
 

Tamil musicians
Musicians from Chennai
Living people
1992 births
Indian male composers
Indian rappers
Indian lyricists
21st-century composers
People from Coimbatore district
Indian male singers
Poets from Tamil Nadu
Tamil poets
Indian male poets
21st-century male musicians
21st-century Indian male actors
Tamil rappers
Tamil male actors